Veles Bastion is the ice-covered buttress of elevation 1223 m forming the southwest extremity of Stribog Mountains on Brabant Island in the Palmer Archipelago, Antarctica.  It has steep and partly ice-free north, west and southwest slopes, and surmounts Zlatiya Glacier to the east and south.

The peak is named after the Slavic god of wisdom and knowledge Veles.

Location
British mapping in 1980 and 2008.

Maps
 Antarctic Digital Database (ADD). Scale 1:250000 topographic map of Antarctica. Scientific Committee on Antarctic Research (SCAR). Since 1993, regularly upgraded and updated.
British Antarctic Territory. Scale 1:200000 topographic map. DOS 610 Series, Sheet W 64 62. Directorate of Overseas Surveys, Tolworth, UK, 1980.
Brabant Island to Argentine Islands. Scale 1:250000 topographic map. British Antarctic Survey, 2008.

Notes

References
 Bulgarian Antarctic Gazetteer Antarctic Place-names Commission. (details in Bulgarian, basic data in English)
 Veles Bastion on SCAR website
 Veles Bastion on AADC website

External links
 Veles Bastion. Adjusted Copernix satellite image

Mountains of the Palmer Archipelago
Bulgaria and the Antarctic